The 1959 NCAA University Division basketball tournament involved 23 schools playing in single-elimination play to determine the national champion of men's NCAA Division I college basketball in the United States. It began on March 7, 1959, and ended with the championship game on March 21 in Louisville, Kentucky. A total of 27 games were played, including a third place game in each region and a national third place game.

California, coached by Pete Newell, won the national title with a 71–70 victory in the final game over West Virginia, coached by Fred Schaus. Jerry West of West Virginia was named the tournament's Most Outstanding Player.

Locations

For the second straight year, Freedom Hall in Louisville hosted the Final Four. The tournament saw two new venues, both used in the first round. The city of Portland hosted the tournament for the first time, hosting at the Pacific International Livestock Exposition. It would be the only time the building would host, as the Memorial Coliseum would open the next year. The state of New Mexico hosted the tournament for the first time, with New Mexico A&M hosting games at its home arena at the time, the Las Cruces High School Arena. This would mark the third time in three years a high school hosted the tournament, and the last time it would happen. The next time the Aggies would host the tournament would be at their own on-campus arena, the Pan American Center. All other venues, and all nine host cities, would host tournament games again in the future.

Teams

Bracket

East region

Mideast region

Midwest region

West region

Final Four

National Third Place Game

Regional third place games

Notes
 Mississippi State qualified for the tournament but university president Benjamin F. Hilbun supported the social degradation of African-American citizens and would not permit the team to participate in the tournament where they would face African-American players.
Five teams - Boston University, Bowling Green, Portland, Saint Joseph's, and Saint Mary's - made their tournament debut.
This would be the most recent tournament appearance, as of 2022, for Dartmouth College. Their 63 year drought is the longest active drought in the NCAA among active Division I schools, and the second longest overall after Harvard's 66 year drought from 1946 to 2012.

See also
 1959 NCAA College Division basketball tournament
 1959 National Invitation Tournament
 1959 NAIA Division I men's basketball tournament

References

NCAA Division I men's basketball tournament
Ncaa
Basketball competitions in Louisville, Kentucky
NCAA University Division basketball tournament
NCAA University Division basketball tournament